Nélson Dantas (November 17, 1927 – March 18, 2006) was a Brazilian actor in film and television. He began in 1949, but his peak period began in 1962. In 1981 he won an award at the Festival de Gramado.

Partial filmography

 A Mulher de Longe (1949)
 Almas Adversas (1952)
 Carnaval em Caxias (1954)
 Matar ou Correr (1954)
 O Assalto ao Trem Pagador (1962) - Priest
 Pluft, o Fantasminha (1962) - Fantasma / Humano
 Capitu (1969) - Padua
 The Alienist (1970) - The Accountant
 A Casa Assassinada (1971)
 Lúcia McCartney, Uma Garota de Programa (1971) - F.A.
 O Doce Esporte do Sexo (1971)
 Os Inconfidentes (1972) - Padre
 Vai Trabalhar Vagabundo (1973)
 A Estrela Sobe (1974)
 O Casamento (1975) - Xavier
 As Aventuras de Um Detetive Português (1975) - Zelador
 Dona Flor and Her Two Husbands (1976) - Clodoaldo the Poet
 Assuntina das Amérikas (1976)
 A Noiva da Cidade (1978)
 O Bom Burguês (1979)
 Insônia (1980) - (segment "Dois Dedos")
 Cabaret Mineiro (1980)
 Engraçadinha (1981) - Dr. Pergamini
 O Santo e a Vedette (1982)
 O Homem do Pau-Brasil (1982) - Friar
 Bar Esperança (1983) - Ivan
 Blame It on Rio (1984) - Doctor
 Memoirs of Prison (1984) - Ilha Grande's Prison Warden
 O Cavalinho Azul (1984) - Vicente's Father
 Urubus e Papagaios (1985)
 Noite (1985)
 Chico Rei (1985)
 Fulaninha (1986)
 Minas-Texas (1989) - Seu Correia
 A Maldição do Sanpaku (1991) - Gold
 Tropicaliente (1994, TV Series) - Bujarrona
 Lamarca (1994) - Lamarca's father
 Four Days in September (1997) - Toledo
 Policarpo Quaresma, Herói do Brasil (1997) - Caldas
 Menino Maluquinho 2: A Aventura (1998) - Costa
 Midnight (1998) - Farmacêutico
 Amor & Cia (1998) - Asprígio
 O Viajante (1998) - Mestre Juca
 Força de um Desejo (1999, TV Series) - Dr. Xavier
 Traveller (1999) - Vice-rei
 Sonhos Tropicais (2001) - Prefeito Pereira Passos
 Desejos de Mulher (2002, TV Series) - Ubaldo
 Narradores de Javé (2003) - Vicentino
 Celebridade (2003, TV Series) - Alcir Nogueira
 Zuzu Angel (2006) - Antônio Lamarca (final film role)

References

External links 

1927 births
2006 deaths
Male actors from Rio de Janeiro (city)